Marri-Bugti Country (Marri and Bugti Country) was a tribal region during the period of British colonial rule in Baluchistan. Marris and Bugtis are the strongest Baloch tribes in the Balochistan. The Marris occupied  in the north, while the Bugtis occupied  in the south. Today, the region is divided into three districts: Kohlu, Dera Bugti and Sibi.

History
The Marris and Bugtis first met the British when a Major Billamore entered their territory during the First Anglo-Afghan War. In April 1840, Captain Lewis Brown was sent to occupy Kahan but surrendered to Marri Chief Doda Khan five months later. Meanwhile, Bugtis had trouble with Sir Charles Napier and General John Jacob came greater trouble with both tribs. In 1845 after the treaty was signed which shows that both tribes were supported financially by Khan of Kalat.

Population
By 1901, the total population of the Country was around 39,000, of which 19,000 or so were Marri, 18,500 Bugti, and 415 Hindu. Most inhabitants were nomadic.

The Marris were divided into three sub-clans: the Bahawalanzai from the Ghazini clan and the Sherzai and Bijarani from the Loharani clan. The Bugti clans were Pairozani Nothani, Durragh Nothani, Kalpar, Habibani, Mondrani, Shambhani Mareta, Masori and Rahija.

See also
Operations against the Marri and Khetran tribes

References

Bibliography

Further reading
 Report of the Indian Statutory Commission ... By Great Britain Indian Statutory Commission, John Allsebrook Simon Simon
 Balochistan Through the Ages: Selection from Government Record. By Baluchistan (Pakistan)
 Matheson, Sylvia A. The Tigers of Baluchistan. London: Arthure Barker Limited (1967). Reprint: Oxford University Press, Karachi (1998), .

Balochistan
Former subdivisions of Pakistan